"Stop It" is the third single album by South Korean idol group B.A.P. It was released on October 23, 2012 under the label of TS Entertainment. The title track was produced by Duble Sidekick, who also produced Sistar's "Loving U" and MBLAQ's "It's War."

Background and release
In early October, 2012, TS Entertainment stated that B.A.P were preparing for their new album. On October 15, teaser photos of Bang Yong-guk and Daehyun were released. These were followed by release of teaser photos of Jongup and Zelo on October 17 and Himchan's and Youngjae's on October 18. On October 23, B.A.P released their third single album, titled "Stop It", the sample of Let Me Clear My Throat by DJ Kool can be heard throughout the song. Together with a music video on TS Entertainment's YouTube channel. The third single album contains three tracks: "Yessir", "Stop It" and " Happy Birthday".

Promotions

Live performances
B.A.P began promotions by first performing "Stop It" on Music Bank on October 26, 2012, followed by performances on Music Core on October 27, M! Countdown on November 1, and Inkigayo on November 4.

Music video
The music video was released on October 23, 2012, the same day as the digital single.

Reception
With the release of the single, B.A.P rose as the top search term on sites like Naver, Daum, and other more. 
The single album peaked at spot 3 on Gaon Album Chart whereas the single itself peaked at spot 28 on Gaon Single Chart.

Track listing
Korean single

Credits and personnel
Bang Yong Guk - vocals, rap
Choi Jun Hong (Zelo) - vocals, rap
Jung Dae Hyun - vocals
Yoo Young Jae - vocals
Kim Him Chan - vocals
Moon Jong Up - vocals
Duble Sidekick - producer, songwriting, music

Charts

Sales

Release history

References

External links
 "Stop It" at iTunes
 
 

B.A.P (South Korean band) albums
2012 albums
Korean-language albums
Single albums
TS Entertainment albums